The MySpace Road Tour is an original online reality series created and produced for Myspace Australia by production company Fremantle Limited. The series is hosted by television and radio personality Jabba (presenter) and documents a cross-country journey to visit and profile Myspace Australia's 10 most extraordinary users.

The first series was sponsored by Just Car Insurance and Intel and ran from July to October 2008 proved immensely popular with the MySpace audience and the show received a great deal of positive press. During MipCom in October 2008 Myspace announced plans for a second series and indicated that it was in talks with cable network Foxtel to distribute series 1 on television. Additionally Myspace has spoken of their plans to produce other versions of the MySpace Road Tour in other countries.

The format was created by FremantleMedia Director of Digital Media Chris Culvenor and Digital Producer Jimmy Foggo. The series can be viewed on the official MySpace Road Tour Profile Page.

Entry Process
The series began in July 2008 when the entire Myspace community was invited to enter via the MySpace Road Tour Profile Page 'MySpace Road Tour' entry page over a three-week period.

To enter users had to submit a photo from their Myspace album, submit their Myspace profile address and write a short answer to the questions "What makes you extraordinary?" & "What extraordinary present would you buy with $10,000?" Myspace and FremantleMedia then selected the top 10 contestants.

The Tour
During the month of September 2008 Jabba (presenter) and the FremantleMedia production crew traveled across the country in a bright blue kombi and profiled each of the 10 contestants and producing an episode focused on each of them (Each episode was 5 min-8 min in duration) and showcased high production values. At the end of each episode our host asked the contestant, "What extraordinary present would they buy with the $10,000 prize?” In addition to the 10 feature episodes, users could also watch bonus content including outtake footage and "Jabba Challenge Episodes" that featured our host carrying out comedic challenges in remote Australian destinations. The series can be viewed on the official MySpace Road Tour Profile Page

The Challenges
The challenge episodes from series one were...

Jabba (presenter) trying to sell an opal in the outback town of Lightning Ridge.

Jabba (presenter) dressed up in a Star Wars costume while crossing the Tasman Sea on the Spirit of Tasmania.

Jabba (presenter) getting Baz Luhrmann's help creating a cinematic trailer for 'Road Tour - The Movie'.

Voting
At the end of the Tour, after the final episode was posted, the entire MySpace community was invited to vote for their favorite "extraordinary contestant" via a voting application on the official MySpace Road Tour Profile Page After two weeks of voting, the voting application closed and the winner was revealed in a finale episode.

The Winner
After two weeks of voting and many fans campaigning for their favorite contestant the winner of the MySpace Road Tour was announced. The winner of series one was Skarlett Saramore the MySpace obsessed pan-sexual metal drummer from Abbotsford, New South Wales, who plays in the band Chaingang .

Notable Moments

References

2008 web series debuts
2008 web series endings
Internet in Australia